Mewundi is a village in the Mundaragi tehsil of Gadag district in Karnataka state, India. It is a situated few kilometres from NH-63 on the state highway from Gadag to Mundaragi.

Demographics 
It has a population of around 3,000 with 500 houses.

A gas-based power plant of 2,000 MW is proposed at this place.

Economy 
The economy of the town depends on the growth of cotton crops.

References 

Villages in Gadag district